Michael Santos may refer to:

 Michael dos Santos (born 1983), Brazilian volleyball player
 Michael G. Santos (born 1964), American life coach and writer
 Michael Santos (footballer) (born 1993), Uruguayan footballer